Saint Eunan may refer to Adomnán, abbot of Iona.

The name may also refer to:

 St Eunan's Cathedral (disambiguation), Christian churches
 St Eunan's College, a school
 St Eunan's GAA, a Gaelic football and hurling club